Philodoria ureraella is a moth of the family Gracillariidae. It was first described by Otto Swezey in 1915. It is endemic to the Hawaiian island of Oahu.

The larvae feed on Urera sandwicensis and Urera kaalae. They mine the leaves of their host plant. The mine starts as a small roundish blotch becoming irregular as it becomes larger from the eating of the larva within. Full-grown larvae are about 6 mm long and pale greenish.

The larva emerges to spin a whitish cocoon on the surface of the leaf. The pupa is about 4 mm long and pale greenish. The pupal period lasts about 10 days.

External links

Philodoria
Endemic moths of Hawaii